The 1954 CCCF Youth Championship was an age restricted association football competition organised by the Football Confederation of Central America and the Caribbean. All games were hosted in San José and took place between 5 and 19 December.

References 

Under-19 association football competitions
1954 in youth association football